Rarz is a village and jamoat in north-west Tajikistan. It is located in Ayni District in Sughd Region. The jamoat has a total population of 8,998 (2015). It consists of 9 villages, including Rarz (the seat), Fatmev, Fatmovut, Guzaribad and Ispan.

Notes

References

External links
Satellite map

Populated places in Sughd Region
Jamoats of Tajikistan